The Rhyacichthyidae or loach gobies are a small family of perciform fish in two genera. The three species all inhabit rivers and streams, often with fast flow. R. aspro is widespread in Western Pacific region (China and Japan to New Guinea and the Solomons), but the two remaining species are restricted to New Caledonia and Vanuatu. Little is known about their breeding behavior, but the eggs or larvae float down into the sea where the young grow up, only to later return to the adult river and stream habitat.

Species

Genus Protogobius
Protogobius attiti Watson & Pöllabauer, 1998
Genus Rhyacichthys
Rhyacichthys aspro (Valenciennes, 1837) - loach goby
Rhyacichthys guilberti Dingerkus & Séret, 1992

References 

Encyclopedia of Life, Family Rhyacichthyidae

 
Gobiiformes
Taxa named by David Starr Jordan